Merl Saunders (February 14, 1934 – October 24, 2008) was an American multi-genre musician who played piano and keyboards, favoring the Hammond B-3 console organ.

Biography
Born in San Mateo, California, United States, Saunders attended Polytechnic High School in San Francisco. In his first band in high school was singer Johnny Mathis. He served in the U.S. Air Force from 1953 to 1957. He worked as musical director of the Billy Williams Revue and served in a similar capacity in Oscar Brown Jr.'s off-Broadway show, Big Time Buck White.

He gained notice in the 1970s when he began collaborating with Jerry Garcia, with whom he had begun playing in 1971 at a small Fillmore Street nightclub called The Matrix. He sat in with the Grateful Dead, and co-founded the Saunders/Garcia Band which produced three albums, and which became the Legion of Mary, with the addition of Martin Fierro (sax) in 1974. It disbanded the following year, but he and Garcia continued to collaborate in the band Reconstruction during 1979, collaborating with Ed Neumeister (trombone), Gaylord Birch (drums) and John Kahn (bass).

He led his own band as Merl Saunders and Friends, playing live dates with Garcia, as well as Mike Bloomfield, David Grisman, Michael Hinton, Tom Fogerty, Vassar Clements, Kenneth Nash, John Kahn and Sheila E. He also collaborated with Grateful Dead percussionist Mickey Hart in the band High Noon.

Saunders took the lead in reintroducing Jerry Garcia to his guitar, after Garcia suffered a diabetic coma in the summer of 1986.

In 1990, he released the world music and New Age classic album Blues From the Rainforest, a collaboration with Garcia and Muruga Booker. This led to the release of a video which chronicled Saunders' journey to the Amazon, and the subsequent albums Fiesta Amazonica, It's in the Air, and Save the Planet so We'll Have Someplace to Boogie. One of the songs from Blues From the Rainforest was used as part of the soundtrack for the TV series Baywatch. Saunders continued to perform with the Rainforest Band for the next ten years.

Saunders worked with musicians Paul Pena, Bonnie Raitt, Phish, Widespread Panic, Miles Davis, and B. B. King.  He also recorded with the Dinosaurs, a "supergroup" of first-generation Bay Area rock musicians.

He had his own record label, Sumertone Records (named for his children Susan, Merl Jr., and Tony), and had also recorded on Fantasy Records, Galaxy Records and Relix Records as well as the Grateful Dead and Jerry Garcia labels. He worked with the Grateful Dead on the theme music for the 1985 TV show The New Twilight Zone. As musical director he completed 2 1/2 season of the show . He also worked on the TV series Nash Bridges, and worked on several soundtracks for movies, including Fritz the Cat and Steelyard Blues. He was production co-ordinator for the Grammy Awards for two years, and for the Grammy's Greatest Moments TV special. He also supplied the music for the computer animation video Headcandy: Sidney's Psychedelic Adventure.

He worked with several charitable organizations such as the Seva Foundation, the Rex Foundation, the Rainforest Action Network, and the Haight-Ashbury Free Clinic, and headlined the Haight Street Music Fair for 24 consecutive years. He has been granted a Doctorate of Music by Unity College, in Unity, Maine.

In 2002, Saunders suffered from a stroke that paralyzed one side of his body and curtailed his musical career, and he died in San Francisco, California, on the morning of October 24, 2008, after fighting infections as a result of complications related to the stroke. He was survived by his two sons, Tony Saunders (bassist) and Merl Saunders Jr. (a former senior executive director of National Academy of Recording Arts and Sciences), and his daughter Susan Mora.

In December 2008, TMZ reported the estate of Merl Saunders had filed a lawsuit against the estate of Jerry Garcia, disputing royalties for a 2004 live album. Saunders' estate claimed they were not aware of the album's release and that they had equal rights to the royalties.  The case was later settled amicably.

Tributes
 On Saturday, February 14, 2009, a tribute to Merl Saunders' life and musical career was held at the Great American Music Hall. It featured actor/director Max Gail and Wavy Gravy as M.C.s, and many past musical collaborators including Grateful Dead guitarist Bob Weir, Tony Saunders, David Grisman, Michael Hinton, Melvin Seals, Michael Warren, Larry Vann, Tonedog, Misa Malone, and Bill Vitt among others.
 A re-launch of the Rainforest Band as a tribute to Merl Saunders took place at the 29th Starwood Festival on July 25, 2009, the site of their last performance, featuring his son Tony Saunders, Michael Hinton, Misa Malone and other members of the Rainforest Band and other Saunders’ projects. Also appearing were Sikiru Adepoju on talking drum and Douglas "Val" Serrant on steel drum and djembe.

Discography

Main studio, live and compilation releases
 1968 - Soul Grooving - Merl Saunders Trio and Big Band
 1972 - Heavy Turbulence - with Tom Fogerty and Jerry Garcia
 1973 - Fire Up - with Tom Fogerty and Jerry Garcia
 1973 - Live at Keystone - with Jerry Garcia, John Kahn & Bill Vitt
 1974 - Merl Saunders
 1976 - You Can Leave Your Hat On - with Aunt Monk
 1979 - Do I Move You
 1982 - San Francisco After Dark
 1987 - Meridien Dreams
 1988 - Keystone Encores - with Jerry Garcia, John Kahn & Bill Vitt
 1990 - Blues From The Rainforest: A Musical Suite - Featuring Muruga Booker, Eddie Moore, Shakti, Joanie Lane aka: Jamie, Special Guest: Jerry Garcia
 1991 - Save The Planet So We'll Have Someplace To Boogie - Merl Saunders & the Rainforest Band
 1992 - Fire Up Plus - with Jerry Garcia, John Kahn, Tom Fogerty and Ron Tutt
 1993 - It's In The Air - Merl Saunders & the Rainforest Band
 1995 - Still Having Fun
 1997 - Keepers - Merl Saunders and Friends
 1998 - Fiesta Amazonica - Merl Saunders & the Rainforest Band
 1998 - The Twilight Zone (Vol. 1): Original Soundtrack from the TV series - Grateful Dead & Merl Saunders
 1998 - Merl Saunders Live With His Funky Friends
 2000 - Struggling Man - Merl Saunders & His Funky Friends
 2004 - Still Groovin''' Merls final tracks recorded. Special Guest Mavis Staples, Bonnie Raitt, David Grisman and Huey Lewis. Produced by Tony Saunders
 2004 - Pure Jerry: Keystone Berkeley, September 1, 1974 - with Jerry Garcia
 2005 - Legion of Mary: The Jerry Garcia Collection, Vol. 1 - Legion of Mary with Jerry Garcia
 2006 - Live On Tour - Merl Saunders & Melvin Seals
 2006 - Well-Matched: The Best of Merl Saunders & Jerry Garcia 2012 - Keystone Companions: The Complete 1973 Fantasy Recordings 2013 - Garcia Live Volume Three - Legion of Mary with Jerry Garcia
 2016 - Garcia Live Volume Six - with Jerry Garcia
 2017 - Garcia Live Volume Nine - with Jerry Garcia
 2019 - Garcia Live Volume 12 - with Jerry Garcia
 2020 - Garcia Live Volume 15 - with Jerry Garcia
 2022 - Garcia Live Volume 18 - with Jerry Garcia

Solo, group leader or co-leader - singles
 1968 - I Pity The Fool / Tighten Up (Galaxy 747)
 1969 - Soul Grooving / Up Up and Away (Galaxy 755)
 1970 - Iron Horse / Little Bit of Righteousness (Galaxy 776) - with Heavy Turbulence
 197? - Julia / Five More (Fantasy 620)
 197? - Save Mother Earth, Parts 1 & 2 (Fantasy 668)
 1981 - San Francisco After Dark / Come To Me (Summertone 214)

Various artist compilations that include previously unreleased Merl Saunders music
 1970 - Belafonte By Request - Harry Belafonte
 1972 - Black Girl (Soundtrack) - Various Artists
 1972 - Fritz The Cat (Soundtrack) - Various Artists
 1973 - Heavy Traffic (Soundtrack) - Various Artists
 1997 - Fire On The Mountain: Reggae Celebrates The Grateful Dead Volume 2 - Various Artists
 1999 - The Third Annual Gathering on the Mountain - Various Artists
 2000 - Gathering On The Mountain: Live Part 2 - Various Artists
 2000 - Gathering On The Mountain: Live Part 3 - Various Artists
 2000 - Sharin' In The Groove - Various Artists
 2001 - Into The Music: Jam Band Vol. 1 - Various Artists

Various artist compilations that include previously released Merl Saunders tracks
 1992 - All Night Long They Play The Blues - Various Artists
 1995 - Bad, Bad Whiskey (The Galaxy Masters) - Various Artists
 1995 - Jazz Collective - Various Artists
 1995 - Sense Of Direction - Various Artists
 1996 - Televisions Greatest Hits Vol. 6: Remote Control - Various Artists
 1996 - Fritz The Cat/Heavy Traffic (Soundtrack) - Various Artists

Playing contributions to other major albums with others
 1971 - Grateful Dead (Skull & Roses) - Grateful Dead
 1971 - Danny Cox - Danny Cox
 1972 - Tom Fogerty - Tom Fogerty
 1972 - Steelyard Blues (Soundtrack) - Various Artists
 1972 - Give It Up - Bonnie Raitt
 1972 - Europe '72 - Grateful Dead
 1972 - Excalibur - Tom Fogerty
 1973 - Oooh So Good 'n Blues - Taj Mahal
 1973 - Betty Davis - Betty Davis
 1973 - Moses - Jerry Hahn
 1973 - Brenda Patterson - Brenda Patterson
 1974 - Garcia (Compliments of Garcia) 1974 - Mo' Roots - Taj Mahal
 1975 - Is Having A Wonderful Time - Geoff Muldaur
 1975 - Cesar 830 - Cesar Ascarrunz
 1976 - David Soul - David Soul
 1978 - Cats Under the Stars - Jerry Garcia Band
 1982 - Run for the Roses - Jerry Garcia
 1984 - Amagamalin Street - Robert Hunter
 1988 - Dinosaurs - Dinosaurs
 1988 - Nightfood - Brian Melvin
 1994 - Free Flight - Palomino Duck
 1996 - Life Is Like That - Jerry Miller
 1997 - DAVA - DAVA And The Peace Army
 1998 - Ticket To Fly - Mike Lawson (Recorded in '94, Released on Sumertone Records, Lawson was the only other artist on Merl's label)
 2000 - King Of The Highway - Norton Buffalo and The Knockouts
 2000 - New Train - Paul Pena
 2000 - Hoy Yen Ass'n - Tommy Guerrero and Gadget
 2001 - The Golden Road (1965-1973) - Grateful Dead
 2001 - Gifts From The Dead - Various Artists
 2002 - Remedy - Jim Weider Band
 2002 - Rare - Five Point Plan

Playing contributions to singles with others
 1972 - Lady Of Fatima / Cast The First Stone - Tom Fogerty (Fantasy F680)
 1972 - Faces Places People / Forty Years - Tom Fogerty (Fantasy F691)
 1972 - Drive Again (Theme from Steelyard Blues) / My Bag (The Oysters) - Gravenites/Bloomfield and others
 1989 - Underground (EP) - Mike Lawson (Psychotronic Records)

Playing contributions to compilations
 1975 - Sampler For Deadheads (#1 of 3) - Jerry Garcia / Robert Hunter
 1975 - Sampler For Deadheads (#2 of 3) - Old And In The Way / Keith And Donna
 1977 - What A Long Strange Trip It's Been - Grateful Dead
 1978 - Grateful Dead Sampler - Various Artists
 1978 - Arista AOR Sampler - Various Artists
 1985 - The Relix Sampler - Various Artists
 1998 - Tom Fogerty/Excalibur - Tom Fogerty
 1999 - The Very Best Of Tom Fogerty - Tom Fogerty
 2000 - Furthur Most - Various Artists
 2000 - The Best Of David Soul - David Soul
 2000 - Anti Love: The Best Of Betty Davis - Betty Davis

Non-performing references on albums
 1975 - Keith and Donna Godchaux - Keith and Donna Godchaux
 1976 - For Dead Heads - Various Artists
 1998 - Blue Light Rain - Jazz Is Dead

Filmography
Movies/DVDs
 Fritz the Cat (1972)
 Black Girl (1972)
 Heavy Traffic (1973)
 Steelyard Blues (1973)
 Headcandy: Sidney's Psychedelic Adventure (1997) Headcandy Productions
 A Tribute to Jerry Garcia: Deadheads Festival Japan 1997 (Japanese Laser Disc, Video Super Rock series VPLR-70650) (1997)
 Blues from the Rainforest: A Musical Suite (1999) Mobile Fidelity
 The Grateful Dead: The End of the Road - The Final Tour '95 (2000) Monterey Video
 Diggers (2006)

Television
 34th Annual Grammy Awards (TV Special) - Production Coordinator
 35th Annual Grammy Awards (TV Special) - Production Coordinator
 Grammy's Greatest Moments (TV Special) - Production Coordinator
 Vietnam: A Television History (TV Series) - Music Performer (11 episodes, 1997)
 The American Experience - Music Performer (6 episodes, 1997–2005)
 The New Twilight Zone 1985 (TV Series)- Music Performer & Musical Director (composer: new title theme) (72 episodes, 1985–1989)
 Nash Bridges (TV series)
 Tales From The Crypt (TV series)
 Baywatch (TV series)
 Simon and Simon (TV series)

Interview
 Digital Interviews: Merl Saunders

References

Other sources
Clark, John Jr. "Former Grateful Dead Keyboardist Merl Saunders Dies", Rolling Stone, October 24, 2008
Selvin, Joel. "Star Keyboardist Merl Saunders Dies", San Francisco Chronicle, October 25, 2008
Obituary by The Associated Press, published in the ''Chicago Tribune

1934 births
2008 deaths
People from San Mateo, California
20th-century American keyboardists
Infectious disease deaths in California
Legion of Mary (band) members
Reconstruction (band) members
Rainforest Band members
20th-century African-American musicians
21st-century African-American people
The Dinosaurs members